Champions League 2015 may refer to:

 2015 AFC Champions League
 2015 CAF Champions League
 2014–15 UEFA Champions League
 2015–16 UEFA Champions League
 2014–15 CONCACAF Champions League
 2015–16 CONCACAF Champions League